PointClear is a limited liability company that works with business-to-business companies in the areas of lead generation and outsourced prospecting. It uses a multiple touch system, meaning that it contacts leads repeatedly via phone, voicemail, and email.

Clients
PointClear's clients have included CenterBeam, D&B, Ingenix (subsidiary of UnitedHealth Group), LXE, Microsoft, and Ultimate Software. CenterBeam claimed that over 70% of its deals have involved PointClear and, as a result, named PointClear Partner of the Year for four consecutive years. Other clients, such as Ingenix, have pointed out the quality of PointClear's business development associates as a selling point.

References

External links 
 

Business services companies of the United States
Companies based in Gwinnett County, Georgia
Companies established in 1997